Wakefields, also known as Home Acres, is a historic plantation house located near Wake Forest, Wake County, North Carolina.  It was built about 1831, and is a two-story, five bay by two bay, transitional Federal / Greek Revival-style frame dwelling.  Two earlier sections are attached to the rear of the main block. The front facade features a central two-tier portico supported by Doric order columns. Also on the property is a dwelling dating to the 18th century and a slave house / chicken coop.

It was listed on the National Register of Historic Places in 1974.

References

Plantation houses in North Carolina
Houses on the National Register of Historic Places in North Carolina
Federal architecture in North Carolina
Greek Revival houses in North Carolina
Houses completed in 1831
Houses in Wake County, North Carolina
National Register of Historic Places in Wake County, North Carolina